Hardeman is a small South American town in Bolivia in the department of Santa Cruz

References

Populated places in Santa Cruz Department (Bolivia)